Iwate University (Iwate Daigaku, abbreviated as Gandai or 岩大) is a national university located in Morioka, Japan.

With its main campus located in Morioka, and another in Kamaishi, Iwate, it has several research institutes at cities in the Sanriku region to support the reconstruction of the fishing industry due to the 2011 Tōhoku Earthquake. These are under the jurisdiction of the Iwate University Sanriku Reconstruction and Regional Revitalization Promotion Organization.

History
Three faculties were established: Faculty of Arts and Sciences, Faculty of Engineering and Faculty of Agriculture.

In April 1954, the General Education Department was established. Reformation of general liberal arts education began in May 1977. The Faculty of Humanities and Social Sciences was later established. Iwate University was incorporated as a national university in April 2004.

In December 2015, Iwate University established the "Iwate University Ihatov Fund" in order to enhance education and research as well as to further promote study support for students. The fund consists of the "General Fund" for broad-ranging support of the university's education, research and student body, and the "Special Fund" for exclusively helping students affected by the Great East Japan Earthquake to complete their studies.

Administration

Undergraduate programs
 Faculty of Humanities and Social Sciences
 Faculty of Education
 Faculty of Science and Engineering
 Faculty of Agriculture

Graduate programs
 Graduate School of Arts and Sciences
 Graduate School of Education
 Graduate School of Science and Engineering
 Graduate School of Veterinary Sciences
 United Graduate School of Agricultural Sciences (UGAS)

Research facilities
 Research Center for Regional Disaster Management
 Center for Hiraizumi Studies
 Sanriku Fisheries Research Center
 Research Center for Manufacturing Technology
 Agri-Innovation Center

Notable people

Alumni

 Chisako Wakatake (writer) - Akutagawa Prize winning author
 Kenji Miyazawa (poet) - graduated from Morioka Agriculture and Forestry College (盛岡高等農林学校, Morioka Kōtō Nōrin Gakkō, now the Faculty of Agriculture)
 Naoki Naruo (footballer) - former football player and manager
 Akira Kano (alpine skier) - Paralympic Champion, winner of three Paralympic gold medals
 Hiroaki Sato (figure skating)
 Daichi Shimoyama (basketball player)
 Eiki Takahashi (racewalker)
 Kikuo Chishima (medical researcher)
 Motoo Fujii (table tennis player)

Historical Museum for Agricultural Education

Formerly the Morioka Agricultural High School, the Historical Museum for Agricultural Education is located within the Iwate University Campus. Constructed in 1912 and completed in December of the same year, the Historical Museum for Agricultural Education is one of the few buildings still surviving as a central facility of a national professional college established in the Meiji era. It has been preserved well with little alteration and was designated as an Important Cultural Property on July 12, 1994. The Guardroom and Old Main Gate were also given the same designation at the same time. A large-scale renovation took place around that time and the Historical Museum was restored to its original state. Polan Plaza, which houses a sundial, was built to the northeast of the Hall in the corner that connects to the Faculty of Agriculture building.

Gallery

References

External links

 Official website

Educational institutions established in 1949
Japanese national universities
Forestry education
1949 establishments in Japan
Universities and colleges in Iwate Prefecture
Morioka, Iwate